Bernard Derrida (born 1952) is a French theoretical physicist. He is best known for his work in statistical mechanics, and is the eponym of Derrida plots, an analytical technique for characterising differences between Boolean networks.

Biography
Derrida entered the École Normale Supérieure in 1971, and received his doctorate in 1976. Since 1993 he has been professor of physics at Université Pierre et Marie Curie and at ENS. He is an expert in statistical mechanics who has adapted statistical-physics ideas to various problems in biology.

He was elected, in 2004 to the Académie des sciences.

In 2010, Derrida was awarded the Boltzmann Medal by IUPAP with John Cardy.

Awarded the Ampère Prize in 2001.

His cousin is philosopher Jaques Derrida.

References

External links
 Personal page

Living people
French physicists
Members of the French Academy of Sciences
Year of birth missing (living people)